Robert Malcolm Simmons FRS (born 23 January 1938) was Director of the Medical Research Council Muscle and Cell Motility Unit from 1991 to 2003 and the Randall Division of Cell and Molecular Biophysics at King's College London from 1995 to 2001.

He graduated with an upper-second class honours degree in Physics from King's College London in 1960, and was further educated at the Royal Institution (PhD, 1965) and University College London (MSc, 1967). 

He was a Lecturer at University College London from 1970 to 1979, and Professor of Biophysics at King's College London from 1983 to 2001.

He was elected a Fellow of the Royal Society in 1995.

References

1938 births
Living people
Alumni of King's College London
Fellows of King's College London
Alumni of University College London
Academics of University College London
Academics of King's College London
Fellows of the Royal Society